The Nuns is the debut studio album by American rock band The Nuns, released in 1980 by record label Bomp!.

Reception 

AllMusic called it "a minor classic of the late-'70s punk era".

Song List 
01 : Savage  /  
02 : Media Control  /  
03 : World War III  /  
04 : You Think You're The Best  /  
05 : Walkin' The Beat  /  
06 : Wild  /  
07 : Getting Straight  /  
08 : Confused  /  
09 : Child Molester  /  
10 : Suicide Child  /  
11 : Lazy

References

External links 
 

1980 debut albums
The Nuns albums